Yamila Tamara Rodríguez (born 24 January 1998) is an Argentine professional footballer who plays as a forward for Brazilian Série A1 club SE Palmeiras and the Argentina women's national team.

Club career
On 9 March 2019, Rodríguez scored the first official goal of Boca Juniors women's team playing in La Bombonera.

International career
Rodríguez represented Argentina at the 2015 South American U-20 Women's Championship.

International goals
Scores and results list Argentina's goal tally first

Personal life
Rodríguez is openly lesbian.

References

External links

1998 births
Living people
People from Posadas, Misiones
Sportspeople from Misiones Province
Argentine women's footballers
Women's association football forwards
Boca Juniors (women) footballers
Santa Teresa CD players
Primera División (women) players
Argentina women's international footballers
Pan American Games silver medalists for Argentina
Pan American Games medalists in football
Footballers at the 2019 Pan American Games
Medalists at the 2019 Pan American Games
Argentine expatriate women's footballers
Argentine expatriate sportspeople in Spain
Expatriate women's footballers in Spain
Argentine expatriate sportspeople in Brazil
Expatriate women's footballers in Brazil
Argentine lesbians
Argentine LGBT sportspeople
Lesbian sportswomen
LGBT association football players